Lester Baker Hennessy (December 12, 1893 – November 20, 1976) was a second baseman in Major League Baseball. He played for the Detroit Tigers.

Hennessy attended Lafayette College, where he played football and baseball.

References

External links

1893 births
1976 deaths
Major League Baseball second basemen
Detroit Tigers players
Baseball players from Massachusetts
Sportspeople from Lynn, Massachusetts
Lafayette Leopards football players
Lafayette Leopards baseball players